Hyaluronan and proteoglycan link protein 1 is a protein that in humans is encoded by the HAPLN1 gene.

Interactions 

HAPLN1 has been shown to interact with Versican.

References

Further reading 

 
 
 
 
 
 
 
 
 
 
 
 
 
 
 
 
 
 
 
 

Extracellular matrix proteins
Glycoproteins